The Solon Dogget House is a historic house at 50 Union Street in Quincy, Massachusetts.  The -story wood-frame house was built in 1872 by Henry G. Pratt, who sold it to Solon Dogget, a poet and artist.  It is a well-preserved local example of Second Empire style, with a mansard roof, patterned shingling on the walls, and Queen Anne porches with spindled friezes and turned posts.  It has Stick style bracketing on the door hoods.

The house was listed on the National Register of Historic Places in 1989.

See also
National Register of Historic Places listings in Quincy, Massachusetts

References

Houses in Quincy, Massachusetts
Second Empire architecture in Massachusetts
Houses completed in 1872
National Register of Historic Places in Quincy, Massachusetts
Houses on the National Register of Historic Places in Norfolk County, Massachusetts